Valeriano Orobón Fernández  (1901–1936) was a Spanish anarcho-syndicalist theoretician, trade-union activist, translator and poet, who wrote the lyrics of the revolutionary song A Las Barricadas.

Born in Cistérniga, Valladolid Province, Orobón was active in labour movement struggles from an early age. An intellectual with a facility for languages, he translated the biography of the well-known German anarchist Max Nettlau written by Rudolf Rocker.

In between theoretical writings, Orobón was deeply involved in efforts to form a revolutionary alliance to stem the rising tide of Fascism and to prepare the way towards revolution. For the post-revolutionary period, in his mind the labor unions were to have a major role in re-organising society on the basis of economic and political decentralism.

He maintained that Anarcho-syndicalism was the more important revolutionary force in Spain, rejecting Communist concepts that he considered etatist. He opposed the spread of such tendencies in the Confederación Nacional del Trabajo (CNT), at the time the largest labour union and main Anarchist organization in Spain.

The CNT was prominent in combating the coup d'état by General Francisco Franco that led to the Spanish Civil War in 1936. It was at that time, shortly before his death, that Orobón wrote the words of To The Barricades, to the tune of Warszawianka 1905 roku – itself a well-known Polish revolutionary song. With words exhorting workers to fight the Fascist enemy, the song became the anthem of the CNT and one of the most popular songs of the Spanish anarchists during the Civil War.

He died soon after in Madrid.

External links
 Jose Luis Gutiérrez Molina, "The thought and the action of Valeriano Orobón Fernandez" in issue 14 of the magazine Bicel (published by the  Fundación de Estudios Libertarios Anselmo Lorenzo)
 "Valeriano Orobón Fernandez, an anarchist from Valladolid" Biography in Spanish

1901 births
1936 deaths
People from the Province of Valladolid
Anarchist theorists
Anarcho-syndicalists
Confederación Nacional del Trabajo members
Spanish anarchists
Spanish people of the Spanish Civil War
Spanish songwriters
German–Spanish translators
20th-century translators
20th-century poets
20th-century Spanish musicians